Burnouf is a surname. Notable people with the surname include:

 Emile Burnouf (1821–1907), Orientalist and author
 Eugène Burnouf (1801–1852), French scholar
 Jean Louis Burnouf (1775–1844), French philologist and translator
 Louis Burnouf

Surnames of Norman origin